Patrick Bradley may refer to:
 Patrick Bradley (footballer) (born 1902), Scottish footballer
 Patrick Bradley (rower), English rower
 Paddy Bradley (born 1981), Irish Gaelic footballer

See also
 Pat Bradley (disambiguation)